Tetsuo may refer to:

Tetsuo (given name)
Tetsuo: The Iron Man
Tetsuo II: Body Hammer
Tetsuo: The Bullet Man
 Tetsuo, a character in Akira (manga)